Zarabcheh (also Romanized as Zarābacheh; also known as Z̧ohrābchī) is a village in Shanderman Rural District, Shanderman District, Masal County, Gilan Province, Iran. At the 2006 census, its population was 176, in 48 families.

References 

Populated places in Masal County